The Kushchyovskaya massacre, carried out on 4 November 2010, was the murder of 12 people including four children in the village of Kushchyovskaya, Krasnodar Krai of southern Russia. The ethnic Tatar family of wealthy local farmer Serever Ametov was targeted and stabbed to death, together with visiting friends and a bystander. The mass murder shocked Russia and highlighted links between criminals and corrupt officials, as the perpetrators were members of a gang who had received protection from the authorities and operated with impunity for years.

Sergei Tsapok, the convicted gang leader and mastermind of the murders, died in prison following a stroke on July 6, 2014. Three of his accomplices had recently committed suicide, the most recent two days prior.

Legacy 
The case was the subject of several documentaries aired in Russia. It also inspired the 2013 TV series Станица (Stanitsa, The Village), a fictitious story loosely based on the events leading to the murder in Kushchyovskaya.

In an article for OpenDemocracy, Grigorii Golosov wrote that the massacre ran contradictory to a perceived propaganda program led by Vladimir Putin to portray Yeltsin's government as allowing crime to run rampant through the country in contrary to Putin's leadership. Golosov noted that the heavy publicity the murders received had tarnished Putin's image.

See also
GTA gang
Ivashevka massacre
Inessa Tarverdieva

References

21st-century mass murder in Russia
Attacks in Russia in 2010
Family murders
People murdered by Russian-speaking organized crime
Massacres in Russia
Massacres in 2010
2010 crimes in Russia
Murdered Russian children
History of Krasnodar Krai
November 2010 crimes
November 2010 events in Russia
Deaths by stabbing in Russia